Ian Olney (born 17 December 1969) is a former footballer who played as a forward. He started his career at Aston Villa, making his senior debut in 1988. He made 88 league appearances for Villa, scoring 16 goals, and 4 years later was sold to Oldham Athletic for £750,000, at that time Oldham's transfer record. 

He was part of the team that dramatically survived relegation from the Premier League on the final day of the season, after defeating Southampton 4–3. He later played for Kidderminster Harriers and Forest Green Rovers.

References
Career stats at soccerbase.com 
Ian Olney - Aston Villa FC - Football-Heroes.net

1969 births
Living people
Footballers from Luton
English footballers
England under-21 international footballers
Association football forwards
Aston Villa F.C. players
Oldham Athletic A.F.C. players
Kidderminster Harriers F.C. players
Forest Green Rovers F.C. players
English Football League players
Premier League players